Alex Forsyth (born January 6, 1955) is a Canadian former professional ice hockey forward.  He was drafted in the first round by the Washington Capitals of the National Hockey League in the 1975 NHL Entry Draft and by the San Diego Mariners of the World Hockey Association in the ninth round of the 1975 WHA Amateur Draft.

Forsyth played just one game in the National Hockey League with the Capitals, during the 1976–77 season.

Career statistics

See also
List of players who played only one game in the NHL

External links

1975 NHL Entry Draft - Alex Forsyth

1955 births
Living people
Canadian ice hockey centres
Ice hockey people from Ontario
Kingston Canadians players
National Hockey League first-round draft picks
Richmond Robins players
San Diego Mariners draft picks
Sportspeople from Cambridge, Ontario
Springfield Indians players
Tulsa Oilers (1964–1984) players
Washington Capitals draft picks
Washington Capitals players
Canadian expatriate ice hockey players in the United States